Queen of Cups is a card used in Latin suited playing cards (Italian, Spanish and tarot decks). It is the Queen from the suit of Cups. In Tarot, it is part of what tarot card readers call the "Minor Arcana".

Tarot cards are used throughout much of Europe to play tarot card games.

In English-speaking countries, where the games are largely unknown, tarot cards came to be utilized primarily for divinatory purposes.

Divination usage

The card depicts a mature woman of fair complexion and golden hair who holds a lidded cup or chalice.  Occultists attempting  to analyze the cup or chalice, have differing views on what exactly the cup or chalice represents in  divinatory contexts. Some occultists claim that it represents The Holy Grail while others compare it to a Thurible. Others go on to suggest it is a mechanistic device either magical in nature or technological. While there is no current concrete explanation as to what the chalice is or what it could represent, it may appear to resemble a robotic or religious device with what appears to be a head, a body and arms holding and supporting an angel on each arm indicating that it could be interpreted as a communication device between the Queen of Cups and angels or  archons. The Queen of Cups herself is described as a model of loving virtue, one who is purer of heart than most, a loving mother, and a loyal friend.
A woman with light brown hair and hazel eyes is said to be represented in this card, during a reading. She has the gift of vision and is imaginative and poetic. Not only does she have visionary dreams, she also acts out her dreams.  This card can indicate love, marriage, happiness and visions The inverted card may warn the querent of a false lover, a perverse woman or a deceitful friend or companion who may have a secret; someone who pretends to be pure of heart but is actually treacherous,  manipulative and without morals.

References

3.    Gray, Eden (1960) The Tarot Revealed: A        modern guide to reading the Tarot Cards. A signet book from The New American Library Inc . Times Mirror. Authorised reprint Published by Inspiration House. 

Suit of Cups
Fictional queens